César Mancillas Amador (born 21 May 1958) is a Mexican politician from the National Action Party. From 2009 to 2012 he served as Deputy of the LXI Legislature of the Mexican Congress representing Baja California.

References

1958 births
Living people
Politicians from Baja California
People from Ensenada, Baja California
National Action Party (Mexico) politicians
21st-century Mexican politicians
Municipal presidents of Ensenada
Autonomous University of Baja California alumni
Deputies of the LXI Legislature of Mexico
Members of the Chamber of Deputies (Mexico) for Baja California